Pikalyovsky (masculine), Pikalyovskaya (feminine), or Pikalyovskoye (neuter) may refer to:
Pikalyovsky District (1927–1932), a former district of Novgorod and Leningrad Oblasts
Pikalyovskoye Urban Settlement, a municipal formation corresponding to Pikalyovskoye Settlement Municipal Formation, an administrative division of Boksitogorsky District of Leningrad Oblast, Russia
Pikalyovskaya Volost, an administrative division of Cherepovets Governorate with the administrative center in the then-selo of Pikalyovo